Memecylon grande is a species of plant in the family Melastomataceae seen in Indo-Malesia. It is a shrub or small tree with ovate leaves, blue flowers and fruits are berries.

References

Endemic flora of Sri Lanka
grande
Vulnerable plants
Taxonomy articles created by Polbot